Equal channel angular extrusion (ECAE) called also equal channel angular pressing (ECAP) is one technique from the Severe Plastic Deformation (SPD) group, aimed at producing Ultra Fine Grained (UFG) material. Developed in the Soviet Union in 1973 by Segal.  However, the dates are not always consistent. In industrial metalworking, it is an extrusion process, The technique is able to refine the microstructure of metals and alloys, thereby improving their strength according to the Hall-Petch relationship. This process improves not only the strength but also other properties such as corrosion and wear resistance of alloys and compounds.    

ECAE is unique because significant cold work can be accomplished without reduction in the cross sectional area of the deformed workpiece.  In conventional deformation processes like rolling, forging, extrusion, and drawing, strain is introduced by reduction in the cross sectional area.  ECAE produces significant deformation strain without reducing the cross sectional area.  This is accomplished by extruding the work piece around a corner.  For example, a square cross section bar of metal is forced through a channel with a 90° degree angle. The cross section of the channel is equal on entry and exit. The complex deformation of the metal as it flows around the corner produces very high strain. Because the cross section remains the same, a work piece can be extruded multiple times with each pass introducing additional strain. 

Die design is critical because of the large forces required. 

To reduce the friction of the pushed sample is lubricated with grease for example mixture of graphite and oil, and to reduce the forces, the process is sometimes carried out at elevated temperatures but then recrystallization can occur which can also leads to excessive grain growth at elevated temperature. 

There are some modifications of the process e.g. incremental ECAP (I-ECAP) for the production of continuous products.

Process routes 
The process can be carried out in multiple passes. According to the rotation angle and direction between next passes, there can be four fundamental process routes named A, Ba, Bc, and C:

 A - The sample in not rotated,
 Ba - the sample is rotated by 90° clockwise and counterclockwise around its longitudinal axis alternatively,
 Bc - the sample is rotated by 90° clockwise around its longitudinal axis,
 C - the sample is rotated by 180° around its longitudinal axis.

Finite element method in the ECAE process 
The behave during deformation and flow of the material, are analyzed by scientists and there are many articles on computer simulation, finite element method is one of the important approaches to understand the deformation occurring in the ECAE process.

See also 
Severe plastic deformation

Strengthening mechanisms of materials

References

External links 

 patent information

Metalworking